Rahiti De Vos (born 11 January 1996) is a French swimmer who has represented French Polynesia at the Pacific Games and France at the 2014 Summer Youth Olympics in Beijing, and at the FINA Swimming World Cup in Dubai and Qatar.

De Vos was born in Tahiti, French Polynesia and educated at Lycée Don Bosco. He relocated to France at the age of 15 to join Font-Romeu National Altitude Training Centre, where he won the youth national championships. In 2016 he won a scholarship to study and swim at the University of Utah, where he studied information systems.

At the 2015 Pacific Games in Port Moresby, he won gold in 6 events including the 400m freestyle, 1500m freestyle, 200m freestyle, 200m butterfly, 4 × 100m freestyle relay, 4 × 200m freestyle relay, and bronze in the 100m butterfly.

At the 2019 Pacific Games in Apia he won gold in the open water swim, 400m freestyle, and the 1500m freestyle, breaking the Pacific Games record in the latter. He also won silver in the 200m freestyle and  relay events.

In March 2020 he qualified for the National Collegiate Athletic Association division 1 swimming championships.

References

Living people
1996 births
People from Papeete
French Polynesian swimmers
Swimmers at the 2014 Summer Youth Olympics